Reconstructionist Judaism is a Jewish movement that views Judaism as a progressively evolving civilization rather than a religion, based on concepts developed by Mordecai Kaplan (1881–1983). The movement originated as a semi-organized stream within Conservative Judaism and developed from the late 1920s to 1940s, before it seceded in 1955 and established a rabbinical college in 1967. Reconstructionist Judaism is recognized by some scholars as one of the five streams of Judaism alongside Orthodox, Conservative, Reform, and Humanistic.

There is substantial theological diversity within the movement. Halakha (Jewish law) is not considered normative and binding, but is instead seen as the basis for the ongoing evolution of meaningful Jewish practice. In contrast with the Reform movement's stance during the time Kaplan was writing, he believed that "Jewish life [is] meaningless without Jewish law" and one of the planks he wrote for the proto-Reconstructionist Society for the Jewish Renaissance stated, "We accept the halakha, which is rooted in the Talmud, as the norm of Jewish life, availing ourselves, at the same time, of the method implicit therein to interpret and develop the body of Jewish Law in accordance with the actual conditions and spiritual needs of modern life." The movement also emphasizes positive views toward modernity, and has an approach to Jewish customs which aims toward communal decision-making through a process of education and distillation of values from traditional Jewish sources.

The movement's 2011 A Guide to Jewish Practice describes a Reconstructionist approach to Jewish practice as "post-halakhic" because the modern world is one in which Jewish law cannot be enforced. Obligation and spiritual discipline exist without the enforcement of a functioning legal system. Thus, Reconstructionist Jews take Jewish law seriously as a source and resource that can shape expectations while not necessarily seeing themselves as bound by inherited claims of obligation. Therefore, the practices advocated in the guide are not monolithic, and commentators provide further insights, arguments, and alternative approaches that span the broad range of views advocated by Reconstructionist rabbis and scholars. The guide states that it "assumes that thoughtful individuals and committed communities can handle diversity and will of necessity reach their own conclusions".

Origin

Reconstructionism was developed by Rabbi Mordecai Kaplan (1881–1983) and his son-in-law, Rabbi Ira Eisenstein (1906–2001), over a period of time from the late 1920s to the 1940s. After being ridiculed by Orthodox rabbis for his focus on issues in the community and the sociopolitical environment, Kaplan and a group of followers founded the Society for the Advancement of Judaism (SAJ) in 1922. Its goal was to give rabbis the opportunity to form new outlooks on Judaism in a more progressive manner. Kaplan was the leader of the SAJ until 1945, when Eisenstein took over. In 1935, Kaplan published his book, Judaism as a Civilization: Toward a Reconstruction of American Jewish Life. It was this book that Kaplan claimed was the beginning of the Reconstructionist movement. Judaism as a Civilization suggested that historical Judaism be given a "revaluation… in terms of present-day thought." Reconstructionism was able to spread with several other forms of literature, most notably the New Haggadah (1941) which for the first time blended Kaplan's ideologies in Jewish ceremonial literature.

Although Kaplan did not want Reconstructionism to branch into another Jewish denomination, it was on the inevitable track of becoming one. At the Montreal conference in 1967, Reconstructionist leaders called for a rabbinical school in which rabbis could be ordained under the Reconstructionist ideology and lead Reconstructionist congregations. By the fall of 1968, the Reconstructionist Rabbinical College was opened in Philadelphia. Along with the establishment of the college, the Reconstructionist Rabbinical Association formed, which gave rabbis a strong network in the religious leadership of Reconstructionism. The founding of these institutions were great strides in its becoming the fourth movement in North American Judaism (Orthodox, Conservative and Reform being the other three).

Reconstructionist Judaism is the first major movement of Judaism to originate in North America; the second is the Humanistic Judaism movement founded in 1963 by Rabbi Sherwin Wine.

Theology
Kaplan believed that, in light of advances in philosophy, science and history, it would be impossible for modern Jews to continue to adhere to many of Judaism's traditional theological claims. In agreement with Orthodox theology (articulated by prominent medieval Jewish thinkers including Maimonides), Kaplan affirmed that God is not anthropomorphic in any way. All anthropomorphic descriptions of God are understood to be metaphorical. Kaplan's theology went further to claim that God is neither a personal nor conscious being; God cannot relate to or communicate with humanity in any way. Kaplan's theology defines God as the sum of all natural processes that allow people to become self-fulfilled.

To believe in God means to accept life on the assumption that it harbors conditions in the outer world and drives in the human spirit which together impel man to transcend himself. To believe in God means to take for granted that it is man's destiny to rise above the brute and to eliminate all forms of violence and exploitation from human society. In brief, God is the Power in the cosmos that gives human life the direction that enables the human being to reflect the image of God.

Most "classical" Reconstructionist Jews (those agreeing with Kaplan) reject traditional forms of theism, though this is by no means universal. Many Reconstructionist Jews are deists, but the movement also includes Jews who hold Kabbalistic, pantheistic (or panentheistic) views of God, and some Jews who believe in the concept of a personal God.

Kaplan's theology, as he explicitly stated, does not represent the only Reconstructionist understanding of theology and theology is not the cornerstone of the Reconstructionist movement. Much more central is the idea that Judaism is a civilization, and that the Jewish people must take an active role in ensuring its future by participating in its ongoing evolution.

Consequently, a strain of Reconstructionism exists which is distinctly non-Kaplanian. In this view, Kaplan's assertions concerning belief and practice are largely rejected, while the tenets of an "evolving religious civilization" are supported. The basis for this approach is that Kaplan spoke for his generation; he also wrote that every generation would need to define itself and its civilization for itself. In the thinking of these Reconstructionists, what Kaplan said concerning belief and practice is not applicable today. This approach may include a belief in a personal God, acceptance of the concept of "chosenness", a belief in some form of resurrection or continued existence of the dead, and the existence of an obligatory form of halakha. In the latter, in particular, there has developed a broader concept of halakhah wherein concepts such as "Eco-Kashrut" are incorporated.

Jewish law and tradition
Reconstructionist Judaism holds that the traditional halakhic system is incapable of producing a code of conduct that is meaningful for, and acceptable to, the vast majority of contemporary Jews, and thus must be reinterpreted in each new time period. Unlike classical Reform Judaism, Reconstructionism holds that a person's default position should be to incorporate Jewish laws and tradition into their lives, unless they have a specific reason to do otherwise. However some Reconstructionists believe that halakha is neither normative, nor binding, but are general guidelines.

Reconstructionism promotes many traditional Jewish practices. Thus, the commandments have been replaced with "folkways", non-binding customs that can be democratically accepted or rejected by the congregations. Folkways that are promoted include keeping Hebrew in the prayer service, studying Torah, daily prayer, wearing kippot (yarmulkes), tallitot and tefillin during prayer, and observance of the Jewish holidays.

Reconstructionists may use distinct prayer books, such as the Kol haneshamah Hebrew/English Reconstructionist prayer book. Marc Shapiro called attention to the Reconstructionist Kol haneshamah taking liberties with the text, sometimes with an English translation "so blatantly inaccurate that we have no choice but to regard it as a conscious alteration."

Beliefs
In practice, Kaplan's books, especially The Meaning of God in Modern Jewish Religion and Judaism as a Civilization are de facto statements of principles.  In 1986, the Reconstructionist Rabbinical Association (RRA) and the Federation of Reconstructionist Congregations and Havurot (FRCH) passed the official "Platform on Reconstructionism". It is not a mandatory statement of principles, but rather a consensus of current beliefs. Major points of the platform state that:

Most Reconstructionists do not believe in revelation (the idea that God reveals his will to human beings). This is dismissed as supernaturalism. Kaplan posits that revelation "consists in disengaging from the traditional context those elements in it which answer permanent postulates of human nature, and in integrating them into our own ideology…the rest may be relegated to archaeology".

Many writers have criticized the movement's most widely held theology, religious naturalism. David Ray Griffin and Louis Jacobs have objected to the redefinitions of the terms "revelation" and "God" as being intellectually dishonest, and as being a form of "conversion by definition"; in their critique, these redefinitions take non-theistic beliefs and attach theistic terms to them. Similar critiques have been put forth by Rabbis Neil Gillman, Milton Steinberg, and Michael Samuels.

Reconstructionist Judaism is egalitarian with respect to gender roles. All positions are open to all genders; they are open to lesbians, gay men, and transgender individuals as well.

Jewish identity
Reconstructionist Judaism allows its rabbis to determine their own policy regarding officiating at intermarriages. Some congregations accept patrilineal as well as matrilineal descent, and children of one Jewish parent, of any gender, are considered Jewish by birth if raised as Jews. This contrasts with the traditional interpretations of Jewish law of both Rabbinical Judaism, in which a child is Jewish by birth if its mother was Jewish; and of Karaite Judaism, in which a child is Jewish by birth if its father was Jewish.

The role of non-Jews in Reconstructionist congregations is a matter of ongoing debate. Practices vary between synagogues. Most congregations strive to strike a balance between inclusivity and integrity of boundaries. The Jewish Reconstructionist Federation (JRF) has issued a non-binding statement attempting to delineate the process by which congregations set policy on these issues, and sets forth sample recommendations. These issues are ultimately decided by local lay leadership.

In 2015 the Reconstructionist Rabbinical College voted to accept rabbinical students in interfaith relationships, making Reconstructionist Judaism the first type of Judaism to officially allow rabbis in relationships with non-Jewish partners. In making the decision, the movement considered that “many younger progressive Jews, including many rabbis and rabbinical students, now perceive restrictions placed on those who are intermarried as reinforcing a tribalism that feels personally alienating and morally troubling in the 21st century.” In April 2016 nineteen Reconstructionist rabbis announced they will form an offshoot group in part to protest the decision to allow rabbis to have non-Jewish partners.

Organizations

Over 100 synagogues and havurot, mostly in the United States and Canada, were affiliated with the Jewish Reconstructionist Federation. As of June 3, 2012, the Reconstructionist movement has been restructured. A joint institution consisting of the Reconstructionist Rabbinical College and the congregational organization is now the primary organization of the movement. 

The movement's new designation was first "Jewish Reconstructionist Communities," and in 2018 became Reconstructing Judaism. Rabbi Deborah Waxman was inaugurated as the president of the Reconstructionist Rabbinical College and Jewish Reconstructionist Communities on October 26, 2014. As the president of the Reconstructionist Rabbinical College, she is believed to be the first woman and first lesbian to lead a Jewish congregational union, and the first lesbian to lead a Jewish seminary; the Reconstructionist Rabbinical College is both a congregational union and a seminary. Waxman is a 1999 graduate of RRC.

The Reconstructionist Rabbinical College educates rabbis. The Reconstructionist Rabbinical Association is the professional organization of Reconstructionist rabbis. The Jewish Reconstructionist youth organization is named No'ar Hadash. Camp Havaya (formerly Camp JRF) in South Sterling, Pennsylvania is the Reconstructionist movement's summer sleep away camp.

As of 2020, the Pew Research Center estimated that Reconstructionist Judaism, along with Humanist Judaism and other smaller denominations, constituted 4% of the United States's 7.5 million Jews.

Relation to other Jewish movements
Originally an offshoot of Conservative Judaism, Reconstructionism retains warm relations with Reform Judaism; however, Orthodox Judaism considers Reconstructionism, and every other non-Orthodox denomination, to be in violation of proper observance of interpretation of Jewish law. The Jewish Reconstructionist Federation is a member of the World Union for Progressive Judaism, in which it gained an observer status in 1990.

In November 2022, a small Korean Karaite community was established in Pyeongtaek, South Korea. The community mixes Eastern European Karaism and the naturalistic philosophy of Rabbi Mordecai Kaplan.

See also

Humanistic Judaism
Jewish secularism

Notes

References

Bibliography
Platform on Reconstructionism, FRCH Newsletter, Sept. 1986, pages D, E
Exploring Judaism: A Reconstructionist Approach, Rebecca Alpert and Jacob J. Staub, The Reconstructionist Press, 1988
David Griffin's article in Jewish Theology and Process Thought, Ed. Sandra B. Lubarsky and David Ray Griffin, State University of New York Press, 1996.
 
Louis Jacobs God, Torah, Israel: Traditionalism Without Fundamentalism Hebrew Union College Press, Cincinnati, 1990;
Judaism As a Civilization Mordecai Kaplan, The Jewish Publications Society, 1994
Mordecai Kaplan "The Meaning of God in Modern Jewish Religion", 1962
Liebman, Charles S. “Reconstructionism in American Jewish Life.” The American Jewish Year Book 71 (1970): 3–99. Available at

External links
Reconstructing Judaism
Reconstructionist Rabbinical College
Reconstructionist Rabbinical Association

 
Jewish religious movements
1968 in Judaism